The 2020 Campeonato Paulista Série A3 is the 27th season of the third level of the São Paulo state league under its current title and the 67th season overall.

Due to the ongoing COVID-19 pandemic, the season was indefinitely suspended on 16 March. Play was resumed on 19 September. Velo Clube were crowned champions, winning promotion alongside EC São Bernardo.

Team changes 
The following teams have changed division since the 2019 season.

Stadiums

Personnel and sponsoring

Managerial changes

League table

Knockout stage

Bracket

Season statistics

Top scorers

References 

Campeonato Paulista seasons
Paulista
Campeonato Paulista Série A3 2020